World War II in the Kingdom of Yugoslavia began on 6 April 1941, when the country was invaded and swiftly conquered by Axis forces and partitioned between Germany, Italy, Hungary, Bulgaria and their client regimes. Shortly after Germany attacked the USSR on 22 June 1941, the communist-led republican Yugoslav Partisans, on orders from Moscow, launched a guerrilla liberation war fighting against the Axis forces and their locally established puppet regimes, including the Axis-allied Independent State of Croatia (NDH) and the Government of National Salvation in the German-occupied territory of Serbia. This was dubbed the National Liberation War and Socialist Revolution in post-war Yugoslav communist historiography. Simultaneously, a multi-side civil war was waged between the Yugoslav communist Partisans, the Serbian royalist Chetniks, the Axis-allied Croatian Ustaše and Home Guard, Serbian Volunteer Corps and State Guard, Slovene Home Guard, as well as Nazi-allied Russian Protective Corps troops.

Both the Yugoslav Partisans and the Chetnik movement initially resisted the Axis invasion. However, after 1941, Chetniks extensively and systematically collaborated with the Italian occupation forces until the Italian capitulation, and thereon also with German and Ustaše forces. The Axis mounted a series of offensives intended to destroy the Partisans, coming close to doing so in the Battles of Neretva and Sutjeska in the spring and summer of 1943.

Despite the setbacks, the Partisans remained a credible fighting force, with their organisation gaining recognition from the Western Allies at the Tehran Conference and laying the foundations for the post-war Yugoslav socialist state. With support in logistics and air power from the Western Allies, and Soviet ground troops in the Belgrade offensive, the Partisans eventually gained control of the entire country and of the border regions of Trieste and Carinthia. The victorious Partisans established the Socialist Federal Republic of Yugoslavia.

The conflict in Yugoslavia had one of the highest death tolls by population in the war, and is usually estimated at around one million, about half of whom were civilians. Genocide and ethnic cleansing was carried out by the Axis forces (particularly the Wehrmacht) and their collaborators (particularly the Ustaše and Chetniks), and reprisal actions from the Partisans became more frequent towards the end of the war, and continued after it.

Background
Prior to the outbreak of war, the government of Milan Stojadinović (1935–1939) tried to navigate between the Axis Powers and the imperial powers by seeking neutral status, signing a non-aggression treaty with Italy and extending its treaty of friendship with France. At the same time, the country was destabilized by internal tensions, as Croatian leaders demanded a greater level of autonomy. Stojadinović was sacked by the regent Prince Paul in 1939 and replaced by Dragiša Cvetković, who negotiated a compromise with Croatian leader Vladko Maček in 1939, resulting in the formation of the Banovina of Croatia.

However, rather than reducing tensions, the agreement only reinforced the crisis in the country's governance. Groups from both sides of the political spectrum were not satisfied: the pro-fascist Ustaše sought an independent Croatia allied with the Axis, Serbian public and military circles preferred alliance with the Western European empires, while the then-banned Communist Party of Yugoslavia saw the Soviet Union as a natural ally.

Following the fall of France to Nazi Germany in May 1940, Britain was the only power in conflict with Germany and Italy (from 10 June 1941), and Yugoslavia's Regent Prince Paul and his government saw no way of saving the Kingdom of Yugoslavia except through adopting policies of accommodation with the Axis powers. Although Germany's Adolf Hitler was not particularly interested in creating another front in the Balkans, and Yugoslavia itself remained at peace during the first year of the war, Benito Mussolini's Italy had invaded Albania in April 1939 and launched the rather unsuccessful Italo-Greek War in October 1940. These events resulted in Yugoslavia's geographical isolation from potential Allied support. The government tried to negotiate with the Axis on cooperation with as few concessions as possible, while attempting secret negotiations with the Allies and the Soviet Union, but those moves would fail to keep the country out of the war. A secret mission to the U.S., led by the influential Serbian-Jewish Captain David Albala with the purpose of obtaining funding to buy arms for the expected invasion went nowhere, while Soviet Union's Joseph Stalin expelled Yugoslav Ambassador Milan Gavrilović just one month after agreeing a treaty of friendship with Yugoslavia (prior to 22 June 1941, Nazi Germany and Soviet Russia adhered to the non-aggression pact the parties had signed in August 1939 and in the autumn 1940, Germany and the Soviet Union had been in talks on the USSR's potential accession to the Tripartite Pact).

1941
Having steadily fallen within the orbit of the Axis during 1940 after events such as the Second Vienna Award, Yugoslavia followed Bulgaria and formally joined the Tripartite Pact on 25 March 1941. Senior Serbian air force officers opposed to the move staged a coup d'état and took over in the following days. These events were viewed with dismay in Berlin, and as Germany was preparing to help its Italian ally in its war against Greece anyway, the plans were modified to include Yugoslavia as well.

Axis invasion and dismemberment of Yugoslavia

On 6 April 1941 the Kingdom of Yugoslavia was invaded from all sides — by Germany, Italy, and their ally Hungary. Belgrade was bombed by the German air force (Luftwaffe). The war, known in the post-Yugoslavia states as the April War, lasted little more than ten days, ending with the unconditional surrender of the Royal Yugoslav Army on 17 April. Apart from being hopelessly ill-equipped when compared to the German Army (Heer), the Yugoslav army attempted to defend all borders, a tactic that resulted in thinly spreading the scarce resources available. Additionally, large numbers of the population refused to fight, instead welcoming the Germans as liberators from government oppression. As this meant that each individual ethnic group would turn to movements opposed to the unity promoted by the South Slavic state, two different concepts of anti-Axis resistance emerged: the royalist Chetniks, and the communist-led Partisans.

Two of the principal constituent national groups, Slovenes and Croats, were not prepared to fight in defense of a Yugoslav state with a continued Serb monarchy. The only effective opposition to the invasion was from units wholly from Serbia itself. The Serbian General Staff was united on the question of Yugoslavia as a "Greater Serbia" ruled, in one way or another, by Serbia. On the eve of the invasion, there were 165 generals on the Yugoslav active list. Of these, all but four were Serbs.

The terms of the surrender were extremely severe, as the Axis proceeded to dismember Yugoslavia. Germany annexed northern Slovenia, while retaining direct occupation over a rump Serbian state. Germany also exercised considerable influence over the Independent State of Croatia (NDH) proclaimed on 10 April, which extended over much of today's Croatia and contained all of modern Bosnia and Herzegovina, despite the fact that the Treaties of Rome concluded between the NDH and Italy on 18 May envisioned the NDH becoming an effective protectorate of Italy. Mussolini's Italy gained the remainder of Slovenia, Kosovo, coastal and inland areas of the Croatian Littoral and large chunks of the coastal Dalmatia region (along with nearly all of the Adriatic islands and the Bay of Kotor). It also gained control over the Italian governorate of Montenegro, and was granted the kingship in the Independent State of Croatia, though wielding little real power within it; although it did (alongside Germany) maintain a de facto zone of influence within the borders of the NDH. Hungary dispatched the Hungarian Third Army to occupy Vojvodina in northern Serbia, and later forcibly annexed sections of Baranja, Bačka, Međimurje, and Prekmurje.

The Bulgarian army moved in on 19 April 1941, occupying nearly all of modern-day North Macedonia and some districts of eastern Serbia which, with Greek western Thrace and eastern Macedonia (the Aegean Province), were annexed by Bulgaria on 14 May.

The government in exile was now only recognized by the Allied powers. The Axis had recognized the territorial acquisitions of their allied states.

Early resistance

From the start, the Yugoslav resistance forces consisted of two factions: the Partisans, a communist-led movement propagating pan-Yugoslav tolerance ("brotherhood and unity") and incorporating republican, left-wing and liberal elements of Yugoslav politics, on one hand, and the Chetniks, a conservative royalist and nationalist force, enjoying support almost exclusively from the Serbian population in occupied Yugoslavia, on the other hand. From the start and until 1943, the Chetniks, who fought in the name of the London-based King Peter II′s Yugoslav government-in-exile, enjoyed recognition and support from the Western Allies, while the Partisans were supported by the Soviet Union.

At the very beginning, the Partisan forces were relatively small, poorly armed, and without any infrastructure. But they had two major advantages over other military and paramilitary formations in former Yugoslavia: the first and most immediate advantage was a small but valuable cadre of Spanish Civil War veterans. Unlike some of the other military and paramilitary formations, these veterans had experience with a modern war fought in circumstances quite similar to those found in World War II Yugoslavia. In Slovenia, the Partisans likewise drew on the experienced TIGR members to train troops.

Their other major advantage, which became more apparent in the later stages of the War, was in the Partisans being founded on a communist ideology rather than ethnicity. Therefore, they won support that crossed national lines, meaning they could expect at least some levels of support in almost any corner of the country, unlike other paramilitary formations limited to territories with Croat or Serb majority. This allowed their units to be more mobile and fill their ranks with a larger pool of potential recruits.

While the activity of the Macedonian and Slovene Partisans were part of the Yugoslav People's Liberation War, the specific conditions in Macedonia and Slovenia, due to the strong autonomist tendencies of the local communists, led to the creation of separate sub-armies called the People's Liberation Army of Macedonia, and Slovene Partisans led by Liberation Front of the Slovene People, respectively.

The most numerous local force, apart from the four second-line German Wehrmacht infantry divisions assigned to occupation duties, was the Croatian Home Guard (Hrvatsko domobranstvo) founded in April 1941, a few days after the founding of the NDH. The force was formed with the authorisation of German authorities. The task of the new Croatian armed forces was to defend the new state against both foreign and domestic enemies. The Croatian Home Guard was originally limited to 16 infantry battalions and 2 cavalry squadrons – 16,000 men in total. The original 16 battalions were soon enlarged to 15 infantry regiments of two battalions each between May and June 1941, organised into five divisional commands, some 55,000 enlisted men. Support units included 35 light tanks supplied by Italy, 10 artillery battalions (equipped with captured Royal Yugoslav Army weapons of Czech origin), a cavalry regiment in Zagreb and an independent cavalry battalion at Sarajevo. Two independent motorized infantry battalions were based at Zagreb and Sarajevo respectively. Several regiments of Ustaše militia were also formed at this time, which operated under a separate command structure to, and independently from, the Croatian Home Guard, until late 1944. The Home Guard crushed the Serb revolt in Eastern Herzegovina in June 1941, and in July they fought in Eastern and Western Bosnia. They fought in Eastern Herzegovina again, when Croatian-Dalmatian and Slavonian battalions reinforced local units.

The Italian High Command assigned 24 divisions and three coastal brigades to occupation duties in Yugoslavia from 1941. These units were located from Slovenia, Croatia and Dalmatia through to Montenegro and Kosovo.

From 1931 to 1939, the Soviet Union had prepared communists for a guerrilla war in Yugoslavia. On the eve of the war, hundreds of future prominent Yugoslav communist leaders completed special "partisan courses" organised by the Soviet military intelligence in the Soviet Union and Spain.

On the day Germany attacked the Soviet Union, on 22 June 1941, the Communist Party of Yugoslavia (CPY) received orders from Moscow-based Comintern to come to the Soviet Union's aid. On the same day, Croatian communists set up the 1st Sisak Partisan Detachment, the first armed anti-fascist resistance unit formed by a resistance movement in occupied Yugoslavia during World War II. The detachment began resistance activities the day after its creation; launching sabotage and diversionary attacks on nearby railway lines, destroying telegraph poles, attacking municipal buildings in surrounding villages, seizing arms and ammunition and creating a Communist propaganda network in Sisak and nearby villages. At the same time, the CPY's Provincial Committee for Serbia made its decision to launch an armed uprising in Serbia and put together its Supreme Staff of the National Liberation Partisan Units of Yugoslavia to be chaired by Josip Broz Tito. On 4 July, a formal order to begin the uprising was issued. On 7 July, the Bela Crkva incident happened, which would later be considered the beginning of the uprising in Serbia. On 10 August 1941 in Stanulović, a mountain village, the Partisans formed the Kopaonik Partisan Detachment Headquarters. Their liberated area, consisting of nearby villages and called the "Miners Republic", was the first in Yugoslavia, and lasted 42 days. The resistance fighters formally joined the ranks of the Partisans later on.

The Chetnik movement (officially the Yugoslav Army in the Fatherland, JVUO) was organised following the surrender of the Royal Yugoslav Army by some of the remaining Yugoslav soldiers. This force was organised in the Ravna Gora district of western Serbia under Colonel Draža Mihailović in mid-May 1941. However, unlike the Partisans, Mihailović's forces were almost entirely ethnic Serbs. The Partisans and Chetniks attempted to cooperate early during the conflict and Chetniks were active in the uprising in Serbia, but this fell apart thereafter.

In September 1941, Partisans organised sabotage at the General Post Office in Zagreb.
As the levels of resistance to its occupation grew, the Axis Powers responded with numerous minor offensives. There were also seven major Axis operations specifically aimed at eliminating all or most Yugoslav Partisan resistance. These major offensives were typically combined efforts by the German Wehrmacht and SS, Italy, Chetniks, the Independent State of Croatia, the Serbian collaborationist government, Bulgaria, and Hungary.

The First Anti-Partisan Offensive was the attack conducted by the Axis in autumn of 1941 against the "Republic of Užice", a liberated territory the Partisans established in western Serbia. In November 1941, German troops attacked and reoccupied this territory, with the majority of Partisan forces escaping towards Bosnia. It was during this offensive that tenuous collaboration between the Partisans and the royalist Chetnik movement broke down and turned into open hostility.

After fruitless negotiations, the Chetnik leader, General Mihailović, turned against the Partisans as his main enemy. According to him, the reason was humanitarian: the prevention of German reprisals against Serbs. This however, did not stop the activities of the Partisan resistance, and Chetnik units attacked the Partisans in November 1941, while increasingly receiving supplies and cooperating with the Germans and Italians in this. The British liaison to Mihailović advised London to stop supplying the Chetniks after the Užice attack (see First Anti-Partisan Offensive), but Britain continued to do so.

On 22 December 1941 the Partisans formed the 1st Proletarian Assault Brigade (1. Proleterska Udarna Brigada) – the first regular Partisan military unit capable of operating outside its local area. 22 December became the "Day of the Yugoslav People's Army".

1942

On 15 January 1942, the Bulgarian 1st Army, with 3 infantry divisions, transferred to south-eastern Serbia. Headquartered at Niš, it replaced German divisions needed in Croatia and the Soviet Union.

The Chetniks initially enjoyed the support of the Western Allies (up to the Tehran Conference in December 1943). In 1942, Time Magazine featured an article which praised the "success" of Mihailović's Chetniks and heralded him as the sole defender of freedom in Nazi-occupied Europe.

Tito's Partisans fought the Germans more actively during this time. Tito and Mihailović had a bounty of 100,000 Reichsmarks offered by Germans for their heads. While "officially" remaining mortal enemies of the Germans and the Ustaše, the Chetniks were known for making clandestine deals with the Italians. The Second Enemy Offensive was a coordinated Axis attack conducted in January 1942 against Partisan forces in eastern Bosnia. The Partisan troops once again avoided encirclement and were forced to retreat over the Igman mountain near Sarajevo.

The Third Enemy Offensive, an offensive against Partisan forces in eastern Bosnia, Montenegro, Sandžak and Herzegovina which took place in the spring of 1942. It was known as Operation TRIO by the Germans, and again ended with a timely Partisan escape. Over the course of the summer, they conducted the so-called Partisan Long March westwards through Bosnia and Herzegovina, while at the same time the Axis conducted the Kozara Offensive in northwestern Bosnia.

The Partisans fought an increasingly successful guerrilla campaign against the Axis occupiers and their local collaborators, including the Chetniks (which they also considered collaborators). They enjoyed gradually increased levels of success and support of the general populace, and succeeded in controlling large chunks of Yugoslav territory. People's committees were organised to act as civilian governments in areas of the country liberated by the Partisans. In places, even limited arms industries were set up.

To gather intelligence, agents of the Western Allies were infiltrated into both the Partisans and the Chetniks. The intelligence gathered by liaisons to the resistance groups was crucial to the success of supply missions and was the primary influence on Allied strategy in the Yugoslavia. The search for intelligence ultimately resulted in the decline of the Chetniks and their eclipse by Tito's Partisans. In 1942, though supplies were limited, token support was sent equally to each. In November 1942, Partisan detachments were officially merged into the People's Liberation Army and Partisan Detachments of Yugoslavia (NOV i POJ).

1943

Critical Axis offensives
In the first half of 1943 two Axis offensives came close to defeating the Partisans. They are known by their German code names Fall Weiss (Case White) and Fall Schwarz (Case Black), as the Battle of Neretva and the Battle of Sutjeska after the rivers in the areas they were fought, or the Fourth and Fifth Enemy Offensive, respectively, according to former Yugoslav historiography.

On 7 January 1943, the Bulgarian 1st Army also occupied south-west Serbia. Savage pacification measures reduced Partisan activity appreciably. Bulgarian infantry divisions participated in the Fifth anti-Partisan Offensive as a blocking force of the Partisan escape-route from Montenegro into Serbia and in the Sixth anti-Partisan Offensive in Eastern Bosnia.

Negotiations between Germans and Partisans started on 11 March 1943 in Gornji Vakuf, Bosnia. Tito's key officers Vladimir Velebit, Koča Popović and Milovan Đilas brought three proposals, first about an exchange of prisoners, second about the implementation of international law on treatment of prisoners and third about political questions. The delegation expressed concerns about the Italian involvement in supplying the Chetnik army and stated that the National Liberation Movement is an independent movement, with no aid from the Soviet Union or the UK. Somewhat later, Đilas and Velebit were brought to Zagreb to continue the negotiations.

In the Fourth Enemy Offensive, also known as the Battle of the Neretva or Fall Weiss (Case White), Axis forces pushed Partisan troops to retreat from western Bosnia to northern Herzegovina, culminating in the Partisan retreat over the Neretva river. It took place from January to April, 1943.

The Fifth Enemy Offensive, also known as the Battle of the Sutjeska or Fall Schwarz (Case Black), immediately followed the Fourth Offensive and included a complete encirclement of Partisan forces in southeastern Bosnia and northern Montenegro in May and June 1943.

The Croatian Home Guard reached its maximum size at the end of 1943, when it had 130,000 men. It also included an air force, the Air Force of the Independent State of Croatia (Zrakoplovstvo Nezavisne Države Hrvatske, or ZNDH), the backbone of which was provided by 500 former Royal Yugoslav Air Force officers and 1,600 NCOs with 125 aircraft. By 1943 the ZNDH was 9,775 strong and equipped with 295 aircraft.

Italian capitulation and Allied support for the Partisans

On 8 September 1943, the Italians concluded an armistice with the Allies, leaving 17 divisions stranded in Yugoslavia. All divisional commanders refused to join the Germans. Two Italian infantry divisions joined the Montenegrin Partisans as complete units, while another joined the Albanian Partisans. Other units surrendered to the Germans to face imprisonment in Germany or summary execution. Others surrendered themselves, arms, ammunition and equipment to Croatian forces or to the Partisans, simply disintegrated, or reached Italy on foot via Trieste or by ship across the Adriatic. The Italian Governorship of Dalmatia was disestablished and the country's possessions were subsequently divided between Germany, which established its Operational Zone of the Adriatic Littoral, and the Independent State of Croatia, which established the new district of Sidraga-Ravni Kotari. The former Italian kingdoms of Albania and of Montenegro were placed under German occupation.

On 25 September 1943, the German High Command launched Operation "Istrien", and on October 21 the military operation "Wolkenbruch" with the aim of destroying Partisan units in the Slovene-populated lands, Istria and the Littoral. In that operation 2,500 Istrians were killed among whom were Partisans and civilians (including women, children, and elderly). Partisan units which did not withdraw from Istria in time were completely destroyed. German troops, including the SS division "Prinz Eugen", on September 25 began to carry out a plan for the complete destruction of the Partisans in Primorska and Istria.

The events which occurred in 1943 would bring about a change in the attitude of the Allies. The Germans were executing Operation Schwarz (Battle of Sutjeska, the Fifth anti-Partisan offensive), one of a series of offensives aimed at the resistance fighters, when F.W.D. Deakin was sent by the British to gather information. His reports contained two important observations. The first was that the Partisans were courageous and aggressive in battling the German 1st Mountain and 104th Light Division, had suffered significant casualties, and required support. The second observation was that the entire German 1st Mountain Division had transited from the Soviet Union on rail lines through Chetnik-controlled territory. British intercepts (ULTRA) of German message traffic confirmed Chetnik timidity. Even though today many circumstances, facts, and motivations remain unclear, intelligence reports resulted in increased Allied interest in Yugoslavia air operations and shifted policy.

The Sixth Enemy Offensive was a series of operations undertaken by the Wehrmacht and the Ustaše after the capitulation of Italy in an attempt to secure the Adriatic coast. It took place in the autumn and winter of 1943/1944.

At this point the Partisans were able to win the moral, as well as limited material support of the Western Allies, who until then had supported General Draža Mihailović's Chetnik Forces, but were finally convinced of their collaboration by many intelligence-gathering missions dispatched to both sides during the course of the war.

In September 1943, at Churchill's request, Brigadier General Fitzroy Maclean was parachuted to Tito's headquarters near Drvar to serve as a permanent, formal liaison to the Partisans. While the Chetniks were still occasionally supplied, the Partisans received the bulk of all future support.

When the AVNOJ (the Partisan wartime council in Yugoslavia) was eventually recognized by the Allies, by late 1943, the official recognition of the Partisan Democratic Federal Yugoslavia soon followed. The National Liberation Army of Yugoslavia was recognized by the major Allied powers at the Tehran Conference, when United States agreed to the position of other Allied. The newly recognized Yugoslav government, headed by Prime Minister Josip Broz Tito, was a joint body formed of AVNOJ members and the members of the former government-in-exile in London. The resolution of a fundamental question, whether the new state remained a monarchy or was to be a republic, was postponed until the end of the war, as was the status of King Peter II.

Subsequent to switching their support to the Partisans, the Allies set-up the RAF Balkan Air Force (under the suggestion of Brigadier-General Fitzroy Maclean) with the aim to provide increased supplies and tactical air support for Marshal Tito's Partisan forces.

1944

Last Axis offensive
In January 1944, Tito's forces unsuccessfully attacked Banja Luka. But, while Tito was forced to withdraw, Mihajlović and his forces were also noted by the Western press for their lack of activity.

The Seventh Enemy Offensive was the final Axis attack in western Bosnia in the spring of 1944, which included Operation Rösselsprung (Knight's Leap), an unsuccessful attempt to eliminate Josip Broz Tito personally and annihilate the leadership of the Partisan movement.

Partisan growth to domination

Allied aircraft specifically started targeting ZNDH (Air Force of the Independent State of Croatia) and Luftwaffe bases and aircraft for the first time as a result of the Seventh Offensive, including Operation Rösselsprung in late May 1944. Up until then Axis aircraft could fly inland almost at will, as long as they remained at low altitude. Partisan units on the ground frequently complained about enemy aircraft attacking them while hundreds of Allied aircraft flew above at higher altitude. This changed during Rösselsprung as Allied fighter-bombers went low en-masse for the first time, establishing full aerial superiority. Consequently, both the ZNDH and Luftwaffe were forced to limit their operations in clear weather to early morning and late afternoon hours.

The Yugoslav Partisan movement grew to become the largest resistance force in occupied Europe, with 800,000 men organised in 4 field armies. Eventually the Partisans prevailed against all of their opponents as the official army of the newly founded Democratic Federal Yugoslavia (later Socialist Federal Republic of Yugoslavia).

In 1944, the Macedonian and Serbian commands made contact in southern Serbia and formed a joint command, which consequently placed the Macedonian Partisans under the direct command of Marshal Josip Broz Tito. The Slovene Partisans also merged with Tito's forces in 1944.

On 16 June 1944, the Tito-Šubašić agreement between the Partisans and the Yugoslav Government in exile of King Peter II was signed on the island of Vis. This agreement was an attempt to form a new Yugoslav government which would include both the communists and the royalists. It called for a merge of the Partisan Anti-Fascist Council of National Liberation of Yugoslavia (Antifašističko V(ij)eće Narodnog Oslobođenja Jugoslavije, AVNOJ) and the Government in exile. The Tito-Šubašić agreement also called on all Slovenes, Croats, and Serbs to join the Partisans. The Partisans were recognized by the Royal Government as Yugoslavia's regular army. Mihajlović and many Chetniks refused to answer the call. The Chetniks were, however, praised for saving 500 downed Allied pilots in 1944; United States President Harry S. Truman posthumously awarded Mihailović the Legion of Merit for his contribution to the Allied victory.

Allied advances in Romania and Bulgaria

In August 1944 after the Jassy-Kishinev Offensive overwhelmed the front line of Germany's Army Group South Ukraine, King Michael I of Romania staged a coup, Romania quit the war, and the Romanian army was placed under the command of the Red Army. Romanian forces, fighting against Germany, participated in the Prague Offensive. Bulgaria quit as well and, on 10 September, declared war on Germany and its remaining allies. The weak divisions sent by the Axis powers to invade Bulgaria were easily driven back.

In Macedonia, the Germans swiftly disarmed the 1st Occupation Corps of 5 divisions and the 5th Army, despite short-lived resistance by the latter. Survivors fought their way back to the old borders of Bulgaria.

After the occupation of Bulgaria by the Soviet army, negotiations between Tito and the Bulgarian communist leaders were organised which ultimately resulted in a military alliance between the two.

In late September 1944, three Bulgarian armies, some 455,000 strong in total led by General Georgi Marinov Mandjev, entered Yugoslavia with the strategic task of blocking the German forces withdrawing from Greece.

The new Bulgarian People's Army and the Red Army 3rd Ukrainian Front troops were concentrated at the old Bulgarian-Yugoslav border. At the dawn of October 8th, they entered Yugoslavia from the south. The First and Fourth Bulgarian Armies invaded Vardar Macedonia, and the Second Army south-eastern Serbia. The First Army then swung north with the Soviet 3rd Ukrainian Front, through eastern Yugoslavia and south-western Hungary, before linking up with the British 8th Army in Austria in May 1945.

Liberation of Belgrade and eastern Yugoslavia

Concurrently, with Allied air support and assistance from the Red Army, the Partisans turned their attention to Central Serbia. The chief objective was to disrupt railroad communications in the valleys of the Vardar and Morava rivers, and prevent Germans from withdrawing their 300,000+ forces from Greece.

The Allied air forces sent 1,973 aircraft (mostly from the US 15th Air Force) over Yugoslavia, which discharged over 3,000 tons of bombs. On 17 August 1944 Marshal Josip Broz Tito offered an amnesty to all collaborators. On 12 September, King Peter broadcast a message from London, calling upon all Serbs, Croats and Slovenes to "join the National Liberation Army under the leadership of Marshal Tito". The message reportedly had a devastating effect on the morale of the Chetniks, many of which later defected to the Partisans. They were followed by a substantial number of former Croatian Home Guard and Slovene Home Guard troops.

In September under the leadership of the new Bulgarian pro-Soviet government, four Bulgarian armies, 455,000 strong in total, were mobilized. By the end of September, the Red Army (3rd Ukrainian Front) troops were concentrated at the Bulgarian-Yugoslav border. In the early October 1944 three Bulgarian armies, consisting of around 340,000 men, together with the Red Army, reentered occupied Yugoslavia and moved from Sofia to Niš, Skopje and Pristina to block the German forces withdrawing from Greece. The Red Army organised the Belgrade Offensive, and took the city on 20 October. At the onset of winter, the Partisans effectively controlled the entire eastern half of Yugoslavia—Serbia, Macedonia, Montenegro—as well as most of the Dalmatian coast. The Wehrmacht and the forces of the Ustaše-controlled Independent State of Croatia fortified a front in Syrmia that held through the winter of 1944–45 in order to aid the evacuation of German Army Group E from the Balkans. To raise the number of Partisan troops Tito again offered the amnesty on 21 November 1944. In November 1944, the units of the Ustaše militia and the Croatian Home Guard were reorganised and combined to form the Army of the Independent State of Croatia.

1945

The Germans continued their retreat. Having lost the easier withdrawal route through Serbia, they fought to hold the Syrmian front in order to secure the more difficult passage through Kosovo, Sandzak and Bosnia. They even scored a series of temporary successes against the People's Liberation Army. They left Mostar on 12 February 1945. They did not leave Sarajevo until 15 April. Sarajevo had assumed a last-moment strategic position as the only remaining withdrawal route and was held at substantial cost. In early March the Germans moved troops from southern Bosnia to support an unsuccessful counter-offensive in Hungary, which enabled the NOV to score some successes by attacking the Germans' weakened positions. Although strengthened by Allied aid, a secure rear and mass conscription in areas under their control, the one-time partisans found it difficult to switch to conventional warfare, particularly in the open country west of Belgrade, where the Germans held their own until mid-April in spite of all of the raw and untrained conscripts the NOV hurled in a bloody war of attrition against the Syrmian Front.

On 8 March 1945, a coalition Yugoslav government was formed in Belgrade with Tito as Premier and Ivan Šubašić as Foreign Minister.

Partisan general offensive

On 20 March 1945, the Partisans launched a general offensive in the Mostar-Višegrad-Drina sector. With large swaths of Bosnian, Croatian and Slovenian countryside already under Partisan guerrilla control, the final operations consisted in connecting these territories and capturing major cities and roads. For the general offensive Marshal Josip Broz Tito commanded a Partisan force of about 800,000 men organised into four armies: the
 1st Army commanded by Peko Dapčević,
 2nd Army commanded by Koča Popović,
 3rd Army commanded by Kosta Nađ,
 4th Army commanded by Petar Drapšin.
In addition, the Yugoslav Partisans had eight independent army corps (the 2nd, 3rd, 4th, 5th, 6th, 7th, 9th, and the 10th).

Set against the Yugoslav Partisans was German General Alexander Löhr of Army Group E (Heeresgruppe E). This Army Group had seven army corps :
 XV Mountain Corps,
 XV Cossack Corps,
 XXI Mountain Corps,
 XXXIV Infantry Corps,
 LXIX Infantry Corps,
 LXXXXVII Infantry Corps.
These corps included seventeen weakened divisions (1st Cossack, 2nd Cossack, 7th SS, 11th Luftwaffe Field Division, 22nd, 41st, 104th, 117th, 138th, 181st, 188th, 237th, 297th, 369th Croat, 373rd Croat, 392nd Croat and the 14th SS Ukrainian Division). In addition to the seven corps, the Axis had remnant naval and Luftwaffe forces, under constant attack by the British Royal Navy, Royal Air Force and United States Air Force.

The army of the Independent State of Croatia was at the time composed of eighteen divisions: 13 infantry, two mountain, two assault and one replacement Croatian Divisions, each with its own organic artillery and other support units. There were also several armoured units. From early 1945, the Croatian Divisions were allocated to various German corps and by March 1945 were holding the Southern Front. Securing the rear areas were some 32,000 men of the Croatian gendarmerie (Hrvatsko Oružništvo), organised into 5 Police Volunteer Regiments plus 15 independent battalions, equipped with standard light infantry weapons, including mortars.

The Air Force of the Independent State of Croatia (Zrakoplovstvo Nezavisne Države Hrvatske, or ZNDH) and the units of the Croatian Air Force Legion (Hrvatska Zrakoplovna Legija, or HZL), returned from service on the Eastern Front provided some level of air support (attack, fighter and transport) right up until May 1945, encountering and sometimes defeating opposing aircraft from the British Royal Air Force, United States Air Force and the Soviet Air Force. Although 1944 had been a catastrophic year for the ZNDH, with aircraft losses amounting to 234, primarily on the ground, it entered 1945 with 196 machines. Further deliveries of new aircraft from Germany continued in the early months of 1945 to replace losses. By 10 March, the ZNDH had 23 Messerschmitt 109 G&Ks, three Morane-Saulnier M.S.406, six Fiat G.50 Freccia, and two Messerschmitt 110 G fighters. The final deliveries of up-to-date German Messerschmitt 109 G and K fighter aircraft were still taking place in March 1945. and the ZNDH still had 176 aircraft on its strength in April 1945.

Between 30 March and 8 April 1945, General Mihailović's Chetniks mounted a final attempt to establish themselves as a credible force fighting the Axis in Yugoslavia. The Chetniks under Lieutenant Colonel Pavle Đurišić fought a combination of Ustaša and Croatian Home Guard forces in the Battle on Lijevča field. In late March 1945 elite NDH Army units were withdrawn from the Syrmian front to destroy Djurisic's Chetniks trying to make their way across the northern NDH. The battle was fought near Banja Luka in what was then the Independent State of Croatia and ended in a decisive victory for the Independent State of Croatia forces.

Serbian units included the remnants of the Serbian State Guard and the Serbian Volunteer Corps from the Serbian Military Administration. There were even some units of the Slovene Home Guard (Slovensko domobranstvo, SD) still intact in Slovenia.

By the end of March, 1945, it was obvious to the Croatian Army Command that, although the front remained intact, they would eventually be defeated by sheer lack of ammunition. For this reason, the decision was made to retreat into Austria, in order to surrender to the British forces advancing north from Italy. The German Army was in the process of disintegration and the supply system lay in ruins.

Bihać was liberated by the Partisans the same day that the general offensive was launched. The 4th Army, under the command of Petar Drapšin, broke through the defences of the XVth SS Cossack Cavalry Corps. By 20 April, Drapšin liberated Lika and the Croatian Littoral, including the islands, and reached the old Yugoslav border with Italy. On 1 May, after capturing the Italian territories of Rijeka and Istria from the German LXXXXVII Corps, the Yugoslav 4th Army beat the western Allies to Trieste by one day.

The Yugoslav 2nd Army, under the command of Koča Popović, forced a crossing of the Bosna River on 5 April, capturing Doboj, and reached the Una River. On 6 April, the 2nd, 3rd, and 5th Corps of the Yugoslav Partisans took Sarajevo from the German XXI Corps. On 12 April, the Yugoslav 3rd Army, under the command of Kosta Nađ, forced a crossing of the Drava river. The 3rd Army then fanned out through Podravina, reached a point north of Zagreb, and crossed the old Austrian border with Yugoslavia in the Dravograd sector. The 3rd Army closed the ring around the enemy forces when its advanced motorized detachments linked up with detachments of the 4th Army in Carinthia.

Also, on 12 April, the Yugoslav 1st Army, under the command of Peko Dapčević penetrated the fortified front of the German XXXIV Corps in Syrmia. By 22 April, the 1st Army had smashed the fortifications and was advancing towards Zagreb.

The long-drawn out liberation of western Yugoslavia caused more victims among the population. The breakthrough of the Syrmian front on 12 April was, in Milovan Đilas's words, "the greatest and bloodiest battle our army had ever fought", and it would not have been possible had it not been for Soviet instructors and arms.
By the time General Peko Dapčević's NOV units had reached Zagreb, on 9 May 1945, they had perhaps lost as many as 36,000 dead. There were by then over 400,000 refugees in Zagreb. After entering Zagreb with the Yugoslav 2nd Army, both armies advanced in Slovenia.

Final operations

On 2 May, the German capital city, Berlin, fell to the Red Army. On 8 May 1945, the Germans surrendered unconditionally and the war in Europe officially ended. The Italians had quit the war in 1943, the Bulgarians in 1944, and the Hungarians earlier in 1945. Despite the German capitulation, however, sporadic fighting still took place in Yugoslavia. On 7 May, Zagreb was evacuated, on 9 May, Maribor and Ljubljana were captured by the Partisans, and General Alexander Löhr, Commander-in-Chief of Army Group E was forced to sign the total surrender of the forces under his command at Topolšica, near Velenje, Slovenia, on Wednesday 9 May 1945. Only the Croatian and other anti-Partisan forces remained.

From 10 to 15 May, the Yugoslav Partisans continued to face resistance from Croatian, and other anti-Partisan forces throughout the rest of Croatia and Slovenia. The Battle of Poljana started on 14 May, ending on 15 May 1945 at Poljana, near Prevalje in Slovenia. It was the culmination and last of a series of battles between Yugoslav Partisans and a large (in excess of 30,000) mixed column of German Army (Heer) soldiers together with Croatian Ustaše, Croatian Home Guard, Slovenian Home Guard, and other anti-Partisan forces who were attempting to retreat to Austria. Battle of Odžak was the last World War II battle in Europe. The battle began on 19 April 1945 and lasted until 25 May 1945, 17 days after the end of the war in Europe.

Aftermath
On 5 May, in the town of Palmanova (50 km northwest of Trieste), between 2,400 and 2,800 members of the Serbian Volunteer Corps surrendered to the British. On 12 May, about 2,500 additional Serbian Volunteer Corps members surrendered to the British at Unterbergen on the Drava River. On 11 and 12 May, British troops in Klagenfurt, Austria, were harassed by arriving forces of the Yugoslav Partisans. In Belgrade, the British ambassador to the Yugoslav coalition government handed Tito a note demanding that the Yugoslav troops withdraw from Austria.

On 15 May 1945 a large column of the Croatian Home Guard, the Ustaše, the XVth SS Cossack Cavalry Corps and the remnants of the Serbian State Guard, and the Serbian Volunteer Corps, arrived at the southern Austrian border near the town of Bleiburg. The representatives of the Independent State of Croatia attempted to negotiate a surrender to the British under the terms of the Geneva Convention that they had joined in 1943, and were recognised by it as a "belligerent", but were ignored. Most of the people in the column were turned over to the Yugoslav government as part of what is sometimes referred to as Operation Keelhaul. Following the repatriations, the Partisans proceeded to brutalize the POWs. The Partisans' actions were partly done for revenge as well as to suppress the potential continuation of armed struggle within Yugoslavia.

On 15 May, Tito had placed Partisan forces in Austria under Allied control. A few days later he agreed to withdraw them. By 20 May, Yugoslav troops in Austria had begun to withdraw. On 8 June, the United States, the United Kingdom, and Yugoslavia agreed on the control of Trieste. On 11 November, parliamentary elections were held in Yugoslavia. In these elections the communists had an important advantage because they controlled the police, judiciary and media. For that reason the opposition did not want to participate in the elections. On 29 November, in accordance with election result, Peter II was deposed by communist dominated Yugoslavia's Constituent Assembly. On the same day, the Federal People's Republic of Yugoslavia was established as a socialist state during the first meeting of the Yugoslav Parliament in Belgrade. Josip Broz Tito was appointed Prime Minister. The autonomist wing in the Communist Party of Macedonia, which dominated during World War II, was finally pushed aside in 1945 after the Second Assembly of the ASNOM.

On 13 March 1946, Mihailović was captured by agents of the Yugoslav Department of National Security (Odsjek Zaštite Naroda or OZNA). From 10 June to 15 July of the same year, he was tried for high treason and war crimes. On 15 July, he was found guilty and sentenced to death by firing squad.

On 16 July, a clemency appeal was rejected by the Presidium of the National Assembly. During the early hours of 18 July, Mihailović, together with nine other Chetnik and Nedić's officers, were executed in Lisičji Potok. This execution essentially ended the World War II-era civil war between the communist Partisans and the royalist Chetniks.

War crimes and atrocities

War crimes and atrocities against the civilian population was prevalent. Non-combat victims included the majority of the country's Jewish population, many of whom perished in concentration and extermination camps (e.g. Jasenovac, Stara Gradiška, Banjica, Sajmište, etc.) run by the client regimes or occupying forces themselves.

The Ustaše regime in Croatia (mostly Croats, but also Muslims and others) committed genocide against Serbs, Jews, Roma and anti-fascist Croats. The Chetniks (mostly Serbs, but also Montenegrins and others) pursued genocide against Muslims, Croats and pro-Partisan Serbs, and the Italian occupation authorities instigated ethnic cleansing (Italianization) against Slovenes and Croats. The Wehrmacht carried out mass executions of civilians in retaliation for resistance activity (e.g. the Kragujevac massacre and the Kraljevo massacre). SS Division "Prinz Eugen" massacred large numbers of civilians and prisoners of war. Hungarian occupation troops massacred civilians (mostly Serbs and Jews) during a major raid in southern Bačka, under the pretext of suppressing resistance activities.

During and after the final stages of the war, Yugoslav communist authorities and Partisan troops carried out reprisals against those associated with the Axis.

Ustashas

The Ustashas, a Croatian ultranationalist and fascist movement which operated from 1929 to 1945 and was led by Ante Pavelić, gained control of the newly formed Independent State of Croatia (NDH) that was set up by the Germans after the invasion of Yugoslavia. The Ustashas sought an ethnically pure Croatian state by exterminating Serbs, Jews and Roma from its territory. Their main focus were Serbs, who numbered about two million. The strategy to achieve their goal was purportedly to kill one-third of Serbs, expel one-third and forcibly convert the remaining one-third. The first massacre of Serbs took place on 28 April 1941 in the village of Gudovac where nearly 200 Serbs were rounded up and executed. The event initiated the wave of Ustasha violence targeting Serbs that came in the following weeks and months, as massacres occurred in villages throughout the NDH, particularly in Banija, Kordun, Lika, northwest Bosnia and eastern Herzegovina. Serbs in villages in the countryside were hacked to death with various tools, thrown alive into pits and ravines or in some cases locked in churches that were afterwards set on fire. Ustasha Militia units razed whole villages, often torturing the men and raping the women. Approximately every sixth Serb living in the NDH was the victim of a massacre, meaning that almost every Serb from this region had a family member that was killed in the war, mostly by the Ustashas.

The Ustashas also set up camps throughout the NDH. Some of them were used to detain political opponents and those regarded as enemies of the state, some were transit and resettlement camps for the deportation and transfers of populations while others were used for the purpose of mass murder. The largest camp was the Jasenovac concentration camp which was a complex of five subcamps, located some 100 km southeast of Zagreb. The camp was notorious for its barbaric and cruel practices of murder as described by testimonies of witnesses. By the end of 1941, along with Serbs and Roma, NDH authorities incarcerated the majority of the country's Jews in camps including Jadovno, Kruščica, Loborgrad, Đakovo, Tenja and Jasenovac. Nearly the entire Romani population of the NDH was also killed by the Ustashas.

Chetniks

The Chetniks, a Serb royalist and nationalist movement which initially resisted the Axis but progressively entered into collaboration with Italian, German and parts of the Ustasha forces, sought the creation of a Greater Serbia by cleansing non-Serbs, mainly Muslims and Croats from territories that would be incorporated into their post-war state. The Chetniks systemically massacred Muslims in villages that they captured. These occurred primarily in eastern Bosnia, in towns and municipalities like Goražde, Foča, Srebrenica and Višegrad. Later, "cleansing actions" against Muslims took place in counties in Sandžak. Actions against Croats were smaller in scale but similar in action. Croats were killed in Bosnia, Herzegovina, northern Dalmatia, and Lika.

German forces

In Serbia, in order to squelch resistance, retaliate against their opposition and terrorize the population, the Germans devised a formula where 100 hostages would be shot for every German soldier killed and 50 hostages would be shot for every wounded German soldier. Those primarily targeted for execution were Jews and Serbian communists. The most notable examples were the massacres in the villages of Kraljevo and Kragujevac in October 1941. Germans also set up concentration camps and were aided in their persecution of Jews by Milan Nedić's puppet government and other collaborationist forces.

Italian forces

In April 1941, Italy invaded Yugoslavia, annexing or occupying large portions of Slovenia, Croatia, Herzegovina, Montenegro, Serbia and Macedonia, while directly annexing to Italy the Province of Ljubljana, Gorski Kotar and the Governorate of Dalmatia, along with most Croatian islands. To suppress the mounting resistance led by the Slovenian and Croatian Partisans, the Italians adopted tactics of "summary executions, hostage-taking, reprisals, internments and the burning of houses and villages." This was particularly the case in the Province of Ljubljana, where Italian authorities terrorized the Slovene civilian population and deported them to concentration camps with the goal of Italianizing the area.

Hungarian forces

Thousands of Serbs and Jews were massacred by Hungarian forces in the region of Bačka, the territory occupied and annexed by Hungary since 1941. Several high-ranking military officials were complicit in the atrocities.

Partisans

The Partisans engaged in the massacres of civilians during and after the war. A number of Partisan units, and the local population in some areas, engaged in mass murder in the immediate postwar period against POWs and other perceived Axis sympathizers, collaborators, and/or fascists along with their relatives. There were forced marches and execution of tens of thousands of captured soldiers and civilians (predominantly Croats associated with the NDH, but also Slovenes and others) fleeing their advance, in the Bleiburg repatriations. Atrocities also included the Kočevski Rog massacre, atrocities against the Italian population in Istria (the foibe massacres) and purges against Serbs, Hungarians and Germans associated with the axis forces during the Communist purges in Serbia in 1944–45. Also with the expulsions of the German population which took place after the war.

Casualties

Yugoslav casualties

The Yugoslav government estimated the number of casualties to be at 1,704,000 and submitted the figure to the International Reparations Commission in 1946 without any documentation. An estimate of 1.7 million war related deaths was later submitted to the Allied Reparations Committee in 1948, despite it being an estimate of total demographic loss that covered the expected population if war did not break out, the number of unborn children, and losses from emigration and disease. After Germany requested verifiable data the Yugoslav Federal Bureau of Statistics created a nationwide survey in 1964. The total number of those killed was found to be 597,323. The list stayed a state secret until 1989 when it was published for the first time.

The U.S. Bureau of the Census published a report in 1954 that concluded that Yugoslav war related deaths were 1,067,000. The U.S. Bureau of the Census noted that the official Yugoslav government figure of 1.7 million war dead was overstated because it "was released soon after the war and was estimated without the benefit of a postwar census". A study by Vladimir Žerjavić estimates total war related deaths at 1,027,000. Military losses are estimated at 237,000 Yugoslav partisans and 209,000 collaborators, while civilian losses at 581,000, including 57,000 Jews. Losses of the Yugoslav Republics were Bosnia 316,000; Serbia 273,000; Croatia 271,000; Slovenia 33,000; Montenegro 27,000; Macedonia 17,000; and killed abroad 80,000. Statistician Bogoljub Kočović calculated that the actual war losses were 1,014,000. The late Jozo Tomasevich, Professor Emeritus of Economics at San Francisco State University, believes that the calculations of Kočović and Žerjavić "seem to be free of bias, we can accept them as reliable". Stjepan Meštrović estimated that about 850,000 people were killed in the war. Vego cites figures from 900,000 to 1,000,000 dead. Stephen R. A'Barrow estimates that the war caused 446,000 dead soldiers and 514,000 dead civilians, or 960,000 dead in total from the Yugoslav population out of 15 million.

Kočović's research into human losses in Yugoslavia during World War Two was considered to be the first objective examination of the issue. Shortly after Kočović published his findings in Žrtve drugog svetskog rata u Jugoslaviji, Vladeta Vučković, a U.S. based college professor, claimed in a London-based émigré magazine that he had participated in the calculation of the number of victims in Yugoslavia in 1947. Vučković claimed that the figure of 1,700,000 originated with him, explaining that as an employee of the Yugoslav Federal Statistical Office, he was ordered to estimate the number of casualties suffered by Yugoslavia during the war, using appropriate statistical tools. He came up with an estimated demographic (not real) population loss of 1.7 million. He did not intend for his estimate to be used as a calculation of actual losses. However, Foreign Minister Edvard Kardelj took this figure as the real loss in his negotiations with the Inter-Allied Reparations Agency. This figure had also already been used by Marshal Tito in May 1945, and the figure of 1,685,000 was used by Mitar Bakić, secretary general of the Presidium of the Yugoslav government in an address to foreign correspondents in August 1945. The Yugoslav Reparations Commission had also already communicated the figure of 1,706,000 to the Inter-Allied Reparations Agency in Paris in late 1945. Tito's figure of 1.7 million was aimed at both maximizing war compensation from Germany and demonstrating to the world that the heroism and suffering of Yugoslavs during the Second World War surpassed that of all other peoples save only those of the USSR, and, perhaps, Poland.

The reasons for the high human toll in Yugoslavia were as follows:
 Military operations of five main armies (Germans, Italians, Ustaše, Yugoslav partisans and Chetniks).
 German forces, under express orders from Hitler, fought with a special vengeance against the Serbs, who were considered Untermensch. One of the worst massacres during the German military occupation of Serbia was the Kragujevac massacre.
 Deliberate acts of reprisal against target populations were perpetrated by all combatants. All sides practiced the shooting of hostages on a large scale. At the end of the war, many Ustaše collaborators were killed in the Bleiburg death marches.
 The systematic extermination of large numbers of people for political, religious or racial reasons. The most numerous victims were Serbs killed by the Ustaše. Croats and Muslims were also killed by the Chetniks.
 The reduced food supply caused famine and disease.
 Allied bombing of German supply lines caused civilian casualties. The hardest hit localities were Podgorica, Leskovac, Zadar and Belgrade.
 The demographic losses due to a 335,000 reduction in the number of births and emigration of about 660,000 are not included with war casualties.

Slovenia
In Slovenia, the Institute for Contemporary History, Ljubljana launched a comprehensive research on the exact number of victims of World War II in Slovenia in 1995. After more than a decade of research, the final report was published in 2005, which included a list of names. The number of victims was set at 89,404. The figure also includes the victims of summary killings by the Communist regime immediately after the war (around 13,500 people). The results of the research came as a shock for the public, since the actual figures were more than 30% higher than the highest estimates during the Yugoslav period. Even counting only the number of deaths up to May 1945 (thus excluding the military prisoners killed by the Yugoslav Army between May and July 1945), the number remains considerably higher than the highest previous estimates (around 75,000 deaths versus a previous estimate of 60,000).

There are several reasons for such a difference. The new comprehensive research also included Slovenes killed by the Partisan resistance, both in battle (members of collaborationist and anti-Communist units), and civilians (around 4,000 between 1941 and 1945). Furthermore, the new estimates includes all the Slovenians from Nazi-annexed Slovenia who were drafted in the Wehrmacht and died either in battle or in prisoner camps during the war. The figure also includes the Slovenes from the Julian March who died in the Italian Army (1940–43), those from Prekmurje who died in the Hungarian Army, and those who fought and died in various Allied (mostly British) units. The figure does not include victims from Venetian Slovenia (except of those who joined the Slovenian Partisan units), nor does it include the victims among Carinthian Slovenes (again with the exception of those fighting in the Partisan units) and Hungarian Slovenes. 47% percent of casualties during the war were partisans, 33% were civilians (of which 82% were killed by Axis powers or Slovene home guard), and 20% were members of the Slovene home guard.

Territory of the NDH
According to Žerjavić's research on the losses of the Serbs in the NDH, 82,000 died as members of the Yugoslav Partisans, and 23,000 as Chetniks and Axis collaborators. Of the civilian casualties, 78,000 were killed by the Ustaše in direct terror and in camps, 45,000 by German forces, 15,000 by Italian forces, 34,000 in battles between the Ustaše, the Chetniks, and the Partisans, and 25,000 died of typhoid. A further 20,000 died in the Sajmište concentration camp. According to Ivo Goldstein, on NDH territory 45,000 of Croats are killed as Partisans while 19,000 perishing in prisons or camps.

Žerjavić estimated the structure of the actual war and post-war losses of Croats and Bosniaks. According to his research, 69–71,000 Croats died as members of the NDH armed forces, 43–46,000 as members of the Yugoslav Partisans, and 60–64,000 as civilians, in direct terror and in camps. Outside of the NDH, a further 14,000 Croats died abroad; 4,000 as Partisans and 10,000 civilian victims of terror or in camps. Regarding Bosniaks, including Muslims of Croatia, he estimated that 29,000 died as members of the NDH armed forces, 11,000 as members of the Yugoslav Partisans, while 37,000 were civilians and a further 3,000 Bosniaks were killed abroad; 1,000 Partisans and 2,000 civilians. Of the total Croat and Bosniak civilian casualties in the NDH, his research showed that 41,000 civilian deaths (18,000+ Croats and 20,000+ Bosniaks) were caused by the Chetniks, 24,000 by the Ustaše (17,000 Croats and 7,000 Bosniaks), 16,000 by the Partisans (14,000 Croats and 2,000 Bosniaks), 11,000 by German forces (7,000 Croats and 4,000 Bosniaks), 8,000 by Italian forces (5,000 Croats and 3,000 Bosniaks), while 12,000 died abroad (10,000 Croats and 2,000 Bosniaks).

Individual researchers who assert the inevitability of using identification of casualties and fatalities by individual names have raised serious objections to Žerjavić's calculations/estimates of human losses by using standard statistical methods and consolidation of data from various sources, pointing out that such an approach is insufficient and unreliable in determining the number and character of casualties and fatalities, as well as the affiliation of the perpetrators of the crimes.

In Croatia, the Commission for the Identification of War and Post-War Victims of the Second World War was active from 1991 until the Seventh Government of the republic, under Prime Minister Ivica Račan ended the commission in 2002. In the 2000s, concealed mass grave commissions were established in both Slovenia and Serbia to document and excavate mass graves from the Second World War.

German casualties
According to German casualty lists quoted by The Times for 30 July 1945, from documents found amongst the personal effects of General Hermann Reinecke, head of the Public Relations Department of the German High Command, total German casualties in the Balkans amounted to 24,000 killed and 12,000 missing, no figure being mentioned for wounded. A majority of these casualties suffered in the Balkans were inflicted in Yugoslavia. According to German researcher Rüdiger Overmans, German losses in the Balkans were more than three times higher – 103,693 during the course of the war, and some 11,000 who died as Yugoslav prisoners of war.

Italian casualties
The Italians incurred 30,531 casualties during their occupation of Yugoslavia (9,065 killed, 15,160 wounded, 6,306 missing). The ratio of dead/missing men to wounded men was uncommonly high, as Yugoslav partisans would often murder prisoners. Their highest losses were in Bosnia and Herzegovina: 12,394. In Croatia the total was 10,472 and in Montenegro 4,999. Dalmatia was less bellicose: 1,773. The quietest area was Slovenia, where the Italians incurred 893 casualties. An additional 10,090 Italians died post-armistice, either killed during Operation Achse or after joining Yugoslav partisans.

See also
 Adriatic Campaign of World War II
 Allied bombing of Yugoslavia in World War II
 Museum of 4 July
 Liberation Front of the Slovenian People
 Uprising in Serbia (1941)
 Seven anti-Partisan offensives
 Air warfare on the Yugoslav Front
 Yugoslavia and the Allies
 National Liberation War of Macedonia
 Slovene Lands in World War II
 Beisfjord massacre, a prisoner transfer from Yugoslavia that led to Norway's largest massacre
 Russian Protective Corps, a Wehrmacht unit composed of White Russian émigrés from Serbia
 Yugoslav World War II monuments and memorials

Notes

References

Bibliography

 
 
 
 
 
 
 
 
 
 
 
 
 
 
 
 
 
 
 
 
 
 
 
 
 
 
 
 
 
 
 
 
 
 
 
 
 
 
 
 
 
 
 
 
 
 Tošić-Malešević, N., 2015. Operacije Narodnooslobodilačke partizanske i Dobrovoljačke vojske Jugoslavije i delovanje Komunističke partije Jugoslavije u 1942. godini /Operations of the National Liberation Partisan and Volunteer Army of Yugoslavia and the actions of the Communist Party of Yugoslavia in 1942. Vojno delo, 67(4), pp. 334–358.
 
 
 

Conflicts in 1941
Conflicts in 1942
Conflicts in 1943
Conflicts in 1944
Conflicts in 1945
Wars involving the Balkans
Independent State of Croatia
 
Yugoslavia
Communist revolutions